The Donaciinae are a subfamily of the leaf beetles, or Chrysomelidae, characterised by distinctly long antennae. They are found in mainly the Northern Hemisphere, with some species found in the Southern Hemisphere.

Life cycle 
Female Donaciinae lay eggs between aquatic plant stems and leaf sheaths. When larvae hatch they are aquatic, and attach themselves to underwater stems and roots of their plant hosts, primarily Potamogeton, for food and oxygen. Adults live in vegetation bordering ponds, marshes, lakes, and brackish water environments. While most Donaciinae have the ability to fly, fully aquatic and flightless species such as Macroplea mutica exhibit the ability to disperse long distance by surviving the passage though the gut of water birds.

Genera
These six genera belong to the subfamily Donaciinae:
 Donacia Fabricius, 1775 i c g b
 Donaciella Reitter, 1920 i c g
 Macroplea Samouelle, 1819 i c g
 Neohaemonia Székessy, 1941 i c g b
 Plateumaris Thomson, 1859 i c g b
 Poecilocera Schaeffer, 1919 i c g b
Data sources: i = ITIS, c = Catalogue of Life, g = GBIF, b = Bugguide.net

References

Further reading

External links

 
 

 
Taxa named by William Kirby (entomologist)
Beetle subfamilies